Camille L. Blouin, better known by her stage name Lady Cam, is an American rapper, model and actress. Lady Cam is from Dallas, Texas.

Career
Over the years Lady Cam has been published in both online and print magazines and has appeared on the cover of Hood Critic and others. Lady Cam has opened for acts such as Juvenile of Cash Money, Shawnna formerly of DTP, Webbie, Cupied, Lil' Flip, Lil Cali and Foxx.

Lady Cam won an award for "Best Female rapper" at the On the Grind Magazine awards, held in Florida.

Acting
Lady Cam took a shot at acting in the late 2000s. She is credited for her roles in Beautiful Creatures (2013), Blues for Life (2016) and Mississippi Turntup (2017).

Discography

Independent Albums
Cam Effect: Reloaded (2011)
Get It Got It (2014)

EPs
Crosslines (2016)
Before the Wilderness (2018)

References

External links
Lady Cam Myspace Page Myspace page

African-American actresses
American women rappers
African-American women rappers
Living people
Actresses from Baton Rouge, Louisiana
1987 births
Underground rappers
21st-century American rappers
21st-century American women musicians
21st-century African-American women
21st-century African-American musicians
20th-century African-American people
20th-century African-American women
21st-century women rappers